The New Brunswick–Maine League was a Class D level minor-league baseball league which had teams in New Brunswick, Canada and Maine, United States during the 1913 season. The league folded on August 23, 1913 and the Fredericton Pets were crowned champions with a 41–24 record.

Cities represented
Bangor, Maine:  Bangor Maroons 
Fredericton, New Brunswick: Fredericton Pets 
Saint John, New Brunswick: Saint John Marathons 
St. Stephen, New Brunswick & Calais, Maine: St. Croix Downeasters

Standings & statistics 
 1913 New Brunswick–Maine League

The league disbanded August 23.

References

Defunct minor baseball leagues in the United States
Baseball in New Brunswick
Sports leagues established in 1913
Sports leagues disestablished in 1913
1913 establishments in Maine
1913 disestablishments in Maine
1913 establishments in New Brunswick
1913 disestablishments in New Brunswick
Defunct baseball teams in Maine
Baseball leagues in Maine